Paradoxostomatidae is a family of ostracods belonging to the order Podocopida.

Genera

Genera:
 Acetabulastoma Schornikov, 1970
 Asterositus Tanaka & Arai, 2017
 Austroparadoxostoma Hartmann, 1979

References

Ostracods